The 2007 FIFA Club World Cup final took place at the Nissan Stadium, Yokohama, Japan on 16 December 2007.

The match pitted Milan of Italy, the UEFA club champions, against Boca Juniors of Argentina, the CONMEBOL club champions. Milan won 4–2 in a match watched by 68,263 people. In doing so, Milan became the first non-Brazilian team – and first European – to win the Club World Cup. They won their fourth FIFA Club World Cup/Intercontinental Cup which was a repeat of the 2003 Intercontinental Cup where Milan had lost to Boca Juniors. Milan also overtook Boca Juniors, Nacional, Peñarol, Real Madrid and São Paulo as the only team to have won the competition four times. Kaká was named as man of the match.

Road to final

Match

Details

Statistics

See also
2003 Intercontinental Cup – contested between same teams
A.C. Milan in European football

References

External links
FIFA Club World Cup Japan 2007, FIFA.com
Technical Report and Statistics (PDF), FIFA.com

World
Final
Fifa Club World Cup Final 2007
Fifa Club World Cup Final 2007
2007
World
Sports competitions in Yokohama
2000s in Yokohama